Tanaupodidae is a family of mites belonging to the order Trombidiformes.

Genera:
 Atanaupodus Judson & Makol, 2009
 Eothrombium Berlese, 1910
 Lassenia Newell, 1957
 Neotanaupodus Garman, 1925
 Neotyphlothrombium Robaux, 1968
 Paratanaupodus Andre & Lelievre-Farjon, 1960
 Paratyphlothrombium Robaux, 1968
 Polydiscia Methlagl, 1928
 Rhinothrombium Berlese, 1910
 Tanaupoda Haller, 1882
 Tanaupodaster Vitzthum, 1933
 Tanaupodus Haller, 1882
 Tignyia Oudemans, 1936

References

Trombidiformes